Ole Bjur (born 13 September 1968) is a Danish former professional footballer who played 384 matches for Brøndby IF, with whom he won three Danish Superliga championships. He played as an attacking midfielder or right midfielder, with a good technique and dribbling ability. He represented the Denmark national team on three occasions, scoring one goal.

He is the younger brother of Danish footballer Jan Bjur, and father of Peter Bjur.

Club career
Born in Rødovre, Bjur started playing football with Vanløse IF in the second-tier Danish 2nd Division. When the structure of Danish football was altered in 1991, Vanløse was placed in the second-tier Danish 1st Division. At Vanløse, Bjur showed himself as a forward with good finishing and eye for the game, and was named 1991 Danish 1st Division Player of the Year. This attracted the attention of defending Danish champions Brøndby IF, and Bjur moved to the top-flight Danish Superliga club in July 1991.

Under Brøndby manager Morten Olsen, Bjur saw a lot of playing time, but had a hard time scoring goals. When Brøndby hired new manager Ebbe Skovdahl in 1992, he went on to deploy Bjur in a right wingback position, where Bjur was immediately praised for his performance. From his wingback position, he would both engage in elegant, dribbling runs as well as hit precise crosses. In the opening of the 1993–94 Superliga season, Bjur saw a slump in form. He got his only red card while at Brøndby in September 1993, and was eventually left out of the Brøndby first team and played a number of games in the reserve team. He returned to form in October 1993, and became one of Brøndby's leading men for set pieces. With Skovdahls change of tactics, to a 3–4–3 formation in March 1994, Bjur was moved up to a forward position, behind the lone striker Mark Strudal, where he reproduced the attacking play of his Vanløse days.

For the 1994–95 Superliga season, Skovdahl changed the formation to a 4–4–2 system, and Bjur settled into the right-sided midfielder spot. He found a good understanding with right back Søren Colding, and the two formed a dangerous pairing on Brøndby's right flank. Bjur was a part of the Brøndby which won the 1994 Danish Cup, his first trophy in his Brøndby career, and was named 1994 Brøndby IF Player of the Year. In the 1995–96 Superliga season, Bjur played all 32 games as Brøndby won their first Danish championship in five years. He also scored the winning goal in the 2–1 defeat of A.S. Roma in the 1995–96 UEFA Cup tournament, though Brøndby were eventually eliminated on the away goals rule.

With Brøndby, Bjur went on to win the 1996–97 Superliga and 1997–98 Superliga championships, as well as the 1998 Danish Cup trophy. He was a part of Brøndby's campaign in the 1998–99 UEFA Champions League tournament, and played a total of 54 games for Brøndby in the European competitions. After more and more games of not feeling satisfied with his own performances, he decided to end his career in November 2000, 32 years old. He went on to concentrate on his studies at the University of Copenhagen.

International career
Following his Brøndby breakthrough in the 1992–93 Superliga season, Bjur was touted as a coming man for the Danish national team. However, after his slump in form for Brøndby in fall 1993, he was not chosen for the Danish national team by national manager Richard Møller Nielsen.

He was eventually included in the national team squad of newly appointed national manager Bo Johansson in the summer 1996. Bjur was called up for Johansson's first game in August 1996. He scored the winning goal in their debut match, as Denmark beat Sweden 1–0 in a friendly match. Bjur started the next national team match, but after 22 minutes, he suffered a minor concussion from a swung elbow, and had to be substituted off. Bjur was then displaced by midfielder Peter Nielsen for the next national team games, before playing his last international game in August 1997.

Honours
Brøndby IF
 Danish Superliga: 1995–96, 1996–97, 1997–98
 Danish Cup: 1993–94, 1997–98

'Individual
1991 Danish 1st Division Player of the Year1994 Brøndby IF Player of the Year''

References

External links
Danish national team profile
 Brøndby IF partial statistics

1968 births
Living people
Danish men's footballers
Brøndby IF players
Danish Superliga players
Denmark international footballers
Association football midfielders
People from Rødovre
Brøndby IF non-playing staff
Sportspeople from the Capital Region of Denmark